Urban Search and Rescue California Task Force 7 or CA-TF7 is a FEMA Urban Search and Rescue Task Force based in Sacramento, California.  CA-TF7 is sponsored by the Sacramento Fire Department.

References

California 7
Organizations based in Sacramento, California